Kerangan Pinggai (also known as Krangan Pinggai) is a longhouse on the Paku river in the Saratok division of Sarawak, Malaysia.

Benedict Sandin, Iban ethnologist, historian, and Curator of the Sarawak Museum in Kuching was born in Kerangan Pinggai in 1918.

Neighbouring settlements include:

References

Populated places in Sarawak